Ochs is a German language surname meaning "ox", and may refer to:

 Adolph Ochs, newspaper publisher and former owner of The New York Times
 Arthur Ochs Sulzberger
 Craig Ochs, American football quarterback
 Heinrich Ochs, German Knight's Cross holder
 Jacques Ochs (1883–1971), épée, saber, and foil fencer, Olympic champion
 Josef Ochs, German Nazi Kripo officer
 Larry Ochs, jazz saxophonist and composer 
 Larry Ochs, mayor of Colorado Springs
 Michael Ochs, American photographic archivist
 Patrick Ochs, German footballer
 Peter Ochs (1752-1821), Swiss politician and revolutionary
 Peter Ochs (born 1950), Jewish theologian
 Phil Ochs (1940-1976), songwriter, musician and recording artist
 Philipp Ochs (born 1997), German footballer
 Robyn Ochs, bisexual activist, writer, and speaker
 Siegfried Ochs, German composer
 Sonny Ochs, music producer and radio host
 Timo Ochs, German footballer

See also
Ochs (disambiguation)

German-language surnames
Jewish surnames
Surnames from nicknames